Peng Lin Lin (born 18 August 1998) is a former Hong Kong professional footballer who played as a midfielder.

Club career
On 18 July 2018, Dreams FC signed Peng to his first professional contract.

After Dreams FC decided to self-relegate, Peng was signed by fellow Hong Kong club Rangers on 1 August 2019.

On 20 May 2020, Peng moved to Kitchee.

On 9 April 2021, Kitchee confirmed that Peng terminated his contract with the club due to personal reasons.

Career statistics

Club

Notes

References

External links
 
 

Living people
1998 births
Hong Kong footballers
Association football midfielders
Hong Kong Premier League players
Dreams Sports Club players
Hong Kong Rangers FC players
Kitchee SC players